Trechus plottbalsamensis is a species of ground beetle in the subfamily Trechinae. It was described by Donabauer in 2005.

References

plottbalsamensis
Beetles described in 2005